宁 may refer to:

Ning (surname), an uncommon Chinese surname
Nanjing, a city in China (an abbreviation of the former name Jiangning)
Ningxia, an autonomous region of China (an abbreviation formed by taking the first character)

See also
All English Wikipedia redirects and disambiguation pages starting with "宁"